The Astromaterials Research and Exploration Science (ARES) Directorate performs the physical science research at the Johnson Space Center (JSC).  It serves as the JSC focus for support to the HQ Science Mission Directorate. ARES scientists and engineers also provide support to the human and robotic spaceflight programs with expertise in orbital debris modeling, analysis of micrometeoroid/orbital debris risks to spacecraft, image analysis and Earth observations. The responsibilities of ARES also include interaction with the Office of Safety and Mission Assurance and the Human Space Flight Programs. They perform research in Earth, planetary, and space sciences and have curatorial responsibility for all NASA-held extraterrestrial samples.

The ARES Directorate recently added a Wordpress Blog that will allow social media Twitter updates to new research and Laboratory discoveries.  Posts will also be made by the Expedition Earth and Beyond Education Program  that will be adding their classroom connection events to the NASA ARES YouTube page.

NASA ARES can also be found on Facebook  where posts of the Crew Earth Observation's Daily photos are being posted as well as other interesting information.

This article includes text from a U.S. Government web site.

Earth Science and Remote Sensing Unit
The Earth Science and Remote Sensing Unit (ESRS) is a remote sensing ground unit of NASA. It is part of NASA's Astromaterials Research and Exploration Science Directorate. It works with the United States Geological Survey (USGS) and NASA's Earth Science Disaster Program.

References

External links
 Facebook
 ESRS

NASA
NASA facilities
Johnson Space Center